Jahking Guillory (born May 14, 2001), is an American rapper and actor, best known for his starring role in the 2016 film, Kicks.  Guillory appears in The Chi on Showtime, and the Netflix series On My Block as Latrelle.
He was born and grew up in Long Beach, California. His Louisiana Creole father is from Louisiana, and his mother is from Guam. He has a younger sister. His father named him - "Jah" stands for God, and "King" stands for royalty.

Filmography

Film

Television

References

External links

Living people
2001 births
American male film actors
African-American male actors
American male television actors
Male actors from Long Beach, California
21st-century African-American people